Typopsilopa nigra is a species of shore fly in the family Ephydridae.

References

Ephydridae
Articles created by Qbugbot
Taxa named by Samuel Wendell Williston
Insects described in 1896